Ritten is a comune (municipality) in South Tyrol in northern Italy.

Territory
The  community is named after the high plateau, elevation , the Ritten or the Renon, on which most of the villages are located. Ritten lies directly northeast of Bolzano, settled on the "meeting point" of the above rivers.

Ritten borders the following municipalities: Barbian, Bolzano, Kastelruth, Karneid, Völs, Jenesien, Sarntal and Villanders.

As of 31 December 2016, Ritten had a population of 7,847.

There are 17 fraziones (subdivisions, usually consisting of one or a few villages and hamlets). These include the central village Klobenstein (Collalbo), in which the townhall is located, as well as Atzwang (Campodazzo), Gissmann (Madonnina), Lengmoos (Longomoso), Lengstein (Longostagno), Mittelberg (Monte di Mezzo), Oberbozen (Soprabolzano), Oberinn (Auna di Sopra), Rotwand (Pietrarossa), Siffian (Siffiano), Signat (Signato), Sill (Castel Novale), Unterinn (Auna di Sotto), Wangen (Vanga), and Wolfsgruben (Costalovara).

Of these only Atzwang and Sill are not located on the plateau, but on the rivers Eisack and Talfer, respectively.

History

The mountain ridge is first mentioned in AD 871–75 as "Mons Ritanus" and then in 1027 as "Mons Rittena". Already around 1200 a mountain inn was established on the plateau. In 1237 Runkelstein Castle was built on a rocky spur in Ritten territory by the lords of Wangen.

The Tyrolean patriotic hero Peter Mayr (1767–1810), involved in the rebellion against Napoleon's forces that occupied Tyrol, was born in the village of Siffian in Ritten.

From the 17th century Ritten has been a popular summer destination for citizens of Bolzano, since the air is considerably cooler on the plateau. This cableway replaced in 1960 the previous rack railway, built in 1907. The railway is still in function on the mountain side between Maria Himmelfahrt and Klobenstein.

Coat of arms

The official community coat of arms consists of gules two chevrons embowed argent; it is the arms of the Lords of Zwingenstein who ruled the village from their castle until 1531. The emblem was adopted in 1967.

Main sights
Near Oberbozen and Lengstein are several groups of fairy chimneys (earth pyramids).

Economy
The candy company Loacker is based in Ritten.

Notable people 
 Frederick von Wangen, bishop of Trento, early 13th century
 Bruno Platter (born 1944) a Roman Catholic priest and the 65th Grand Master of the Teutonic Order

Society

Linguistic distribution
According to the 2011 census, 95.20% of the population speak German, 4.55% Italian and 0.25% Ladin as first language.

Demographic evolution

References

External links

 Homepage of the municipality

Municipalities of South Tyrol